Metuge District is a district of Cabo Delgado Province in northern Mozambique.

External links
Government profile 

Districts in Cabo Delgado Province